Bad Reputation is the debut solo studio album by American recording artist Joan Jett. It was originally released independently on May 17, 1980 as a self-titled album after her previous band The Runaways disbanded. After Jett signed with Boardwalk Records, the album was re-released worldwide with the new title on January 23, 1981. The album was positively received by critics and reached number 51 on the Billboard 200.

Background
Record producer Kenny Laguna financed the album's recording sessions using borrowed studio credits. Recorded before Joan Jett formed The Blackhearts, the majority of the album featured Jett backed by members of the Roll-Ups, with Lea Hart on guitar, Jeff Peters on bass and Paul Simmons on drums. Other tracks include well known musicians, such as the Sex Pistols' Steve Jones and Paul Cook, and Blondie's Clem Burke and Frank Infante.

After independently recording the album with Laguna, Jett took the record to a number of major record labels, none of which were interested in releasing the project. Rather than continue to hunt for a willing label, Laguna and Jett decided to fund the pressing of the album themselves. The original, self-released, version of the album was simply titled Joan Jett and was sold directly to concert-goers and record stores out of Laguna's trunk.

The album sold relatively well, prompting its re-release a year later as Bad Reputation on Boardwalk Records, with rearranged but otherwise identical track listing. Jett said that the new title referred to the bad reputation that she had as a former member of The Runaways.

When the album's European rights were secured through Ariola Records, "Hanky Panky" replaced "Wooly Bully" as the final song on Side 2. When the album was issued through Boardwalk Records in the U.S. under the title Bad Reputation, the label stuck with "Wooly Bully" as the final track, making the "Hanky Panky" import version a collector's item. However, the song was later included as a bonus track on CD re-releases.

The original Australian release featured a completely different cover, and "Hanky Panky" replaced "Shout" as track 9. "Do You Wanna Touch Me (Oh Yeah)" was also a huge hit in Australia when it was released hot on the heels of "I Love Rock 'n' Roll" and "Crimson and Clover" from Jett's 1981 album, I Love Rock 'n Roll.

In 1999, the album was again re-issued, this time on CD with several bonus tracks and a remastered version of the original album. All subsequent reissues feature the tracks in their original pre-Boardwalk release order.

Singles
"You Don't Own Me" was released in Europe as a single prior to the album in 1979. The B-side was an early version of "I Love Rock 'n Roll" performed with Cook and Jones. This b-side version was later released on the rarities album Flashback.
"Make Believe" was released as a 7-inch single on the Ariola label. The record was accompanied by a fold-out mini-poster sleeve featuring the album cover photo. The B-side was a cover version of "Call Me Lightning" which also turned up on Flashback as well as CD versions of Bad Reputation
An edited version of "You Don't Know What You've Got" b/w "Don't Abuse Me" (and one b/w "I'm Gonna Run Away" with both credited to Joan Jett & the Blackhearts) was released in a few European countries. 
"Do You Wanna Touch Me (Oh Yeah)" was released by Boardwalk following the success of Jett's versions of "I Love Rock 'n' Roll" and "Crimson and Clover". The B-side was "Victim of Circumstance" which was culled from the later album. It was paired with various other B sides in other markets.
Boardwalk also released "You Don't Own Me" credited to Joan Jett & the Blackhearts (b/w "Jezebel" as Joan Jett) in the US and Canada, which had been successful overseas sometime before October, 1981, but it was largely ignored by US rock radio.
Ariola released "Bad Reputation" as a single in Germany. B-side, "You Don't Know What You've Got."

Critical reception

Reviewing Bad Reputation in 1981, Robert Christgau of The Village Voice said, "Producers Kenny Laguna and Ritchie Cordell make the old glitter formula of readymade riffs 'n' blare sound suitable for albums, and they get plenty of help from reformed Runaway Jett, who has writing credit on four of these twelve tunes and comes on tuffer than any gurl in history." Tom Carson of Rolling Stone found that Bad Reputation "is flawed by its literal-mindedness – the arrangements pump along gamely yet rarely swing or soar – and by some unresourceful material", but concluded that "in its mood and feel", the album "is a determined retelling of what sometimes seems like the truest rock story there is."

In a retrospective review, AllMusic critic Steve Huey described Bad Reputation as "an infectious romp through her influences, ranging from classic '50s and '60s rock & roll through glam rock, three-chord loud'n'fast Ramones punk, and poppier new wave guitar rock." Rolling Stone placed Bad Reputation at No. 36 on its list of the "50 Coolest Albums of All Time" in 2002.

Track listing

Personnel
Joan Jett & The Roll-Ups

Joan Jett – lead and backing vocals; rhythm guitar
Lea Hart – lead guitar; backing vocals
Jeff Peters – bass; backing vocals
Kenny Laguna – keyboards; backing vocals
Paul Simmons – drums; backing vocals
Additional personnel
Buzz Chandler – lead guitar on track 2
Frank Infante –  guitar on tracks 2, 12, 13
Lou Maxfield – lead guitar on track 3 and 15
Sean Tyla – twelve-string acoustic guitar on track 10
Steve Jones – bass guitar; lead and rhythm guitars on track 4; bass guitar and lead guitar on track 11
Eric Ambel – guitar; backing vocals on track 16 (2006)
Jeff Bannister – piano on tracks 4 and 11
Richard D'Andrea – bass guitar on tracks 3 and 15
Micky Groome – bass guitar on track 12 and 13
Clem Burke – drums on track 12 and 13
Paul Cook – drums on tracks 4 and 11
Joel Turrisi – drums on tracks 3 and 15
Johnny Earle – saxophone on tracks 6 and 9
Mick Eve – saxophone on tracks 4 and 11 
Commander Goonwaddle – tubular bells on track 7
Ritchie Cordell – sound effects; backing vocals
Martyn Watson – backing vocals
Rainbeaux Smith – backing vocals (credited as Rainbow Smith)

Production
Kenny Laguna – production
Ritchie Cordell – production, photography
Mark Dodson – engineering; associate producer
Steve Jones – producer of tracks 4 and 11
Paul Cook – producer of tracks 4 and 11
Joe Latimer – engineer
Stuart Panes – engineer
Butch Yates – assistant engineer
Malcolm Davies – mastering

Charts

References

External links

Joan Jett (album) at JoanJett.com (archive link)
Bad Reputation at JoanJett.com (archive link)

1980 debut albums
Joan Jett albums
Self-released albums
Ariola Records albums
Blackheart Records albums